Binod Bihari Verma (1937–2003) was a Maithili writer and military doctor. He is known for Maithili Karna Kayasthak Panjik Sarvekshan, his work on ancient genealogical charts known as Panjis, as well as his depiction of rural poor of the Mithila region. He worked as a medical officer in the Indian Army, as a lecturer in a Dental College, and as a private medical practitioner. He simultaneously carried on his literary career via independent publishing and in the magazines Mithila Mihir and Karnamrit.

Early life and education
Binod Bihari Vema was born in Baur, Darbhanga district, Bihar on 3 December 1937 to Rameshwar Lal Das and Yogmaya Devi. Verma attended primary school in the village of Rasiyari. He travelled with his father and uncle as they campaigned in favour of Mahatma Gandhi's ideas in the remote tribal areas of Chaibasa, Ranchi, and Singhbhum in South Bihar.

Verma's education continued at the District School in Chaibasa, the missionary school of St. John's at Ranchi, and at Langat Singh College in Muzaffarpur. He subsequently attended the Darbhanga Medical College, graduating in 1962.

Military service
In 1962, during the Sino-Indian War, Verma joined the Indian Army. He was commissioned into the Army Medical Corps in 1963 and served in areas including Himachal Pradesh, Sikkim, Punjab, Assam and Goa.

Verma fought in the Indo-Pakistani War of 1965, and in 1984 took a permanent commission in the army. He was involved in Operation Bluestar in 1984 and the IPKF operations in Sri Lanka in 1988–1990, where he commanded the 404 Field Ambulance at Vavuniya. He took early retirement from active army service in 1990.

Later life and death
After his retirement, Verma settled in Bhubaneswar, Orissa, where he started a clinical practice. During this period that he regularly published novels, biographies, and contributions to Maithili magazines, as well as teaching biochemistry in a dental college in Bhubaneswar.

In 1999 he was diagnosed as suffering from prostate cancer. He died on 9 November 2003 in Bangalore.

Personal life
Verma married Pratibha Verma on 4 July 1965. The couple had three daughters and two sons. Verma was able to speak a number of languages including Urdu, Sanskrit, Odia, Assamese and Bengali, and knew the scripts of various Indian languages, such as old Maithili, Assamese, Gurmukhi, Odia and Nepali.

Writing
Verma began writing autobiographical and observational stories and poems while at school. He also wrote patriotic and motivational poems, published in various school magazines and occasionally in Mithila Mihir, a magazine whose audience was the Kayastha community.

He began contributing regularly to various other Maithili magazines. His depictions of rural life were published as a short story collection entitled Balanak Bonihar O Pallavi. He also wrote a social novel, Nayanmani, which was initially published in serial format in Mithila Mihir. Pen names used by Verma included Vinod and Vinod Gopal.

In 1973, he published his magnum opus, Maithili Karna Kayasthak Panjik Sarvekshan, the result of months of extensive research on the fast disappearing ancient genealogical charts. The book is now the only surviving record of certain groups of Panjis which have now disappeared.

Maithili Karna Kayasthak Panjik Sarvekshan was followed by a long writing hiatus, until after his retirement from the Army. He published his previous works as collections. He also started contributing frequently to Karnamrit, a new Maithili magazine, writing articles on folks songs of Mithila, the life and contribution of George Abraham Grierson, the biography of Radha Krishna Choudhary, and the literary history of Maithili.

Selected works
Maithili Karna Kayasthak Panjik Sarvekshan – a survey of the Panjis of the Karan Kayasthas of Mithila. 1973, Madhubani.
Nayanmani, a novel describing the rural scene in Post Independence bihar.Initially published in parts in "Mithila Mihir" from February 1968 to April 1968. 1997, Bhubaneswar.
Balanak Bonihar O Pallavi – a short story collection on the village life of Mithila on the banks of the Kosi River and its tributaries. 1994. Bhubaneswar.
Tapasa vai Ganga – biography of Radha Krishna Choudhary. 1995, Bhubaneswar.
Adim Purkha – translation of Sahitya Akademi award-winning Oriya novelist Gopinath Mohanty's work "Dadi Burha". 2001, Sahitya Akademi, New Delhi.
Vedmurti Taponishth SriRam Sharma Acharya – biography of Shriram Sharma Acharya. 2005, Bhubaneswar.

References

External links
Maithili Language:An Introduction
Tradition of music in Mithilia

1937 births
2003 deaths
Indian male novelists
Indian book publishers (people)
Novelists from Bihar
20th-century Indian novelists
People from Darbhanga district
20th-century Indian male writers